Hans Rasmus Astrup (23 March 1939 – 23 April 2021) was a Norwegian billionaire heir, ship broker, and art collector. He was founder of the Astrup Fearnley Museum of Modern Art in Oslo.

Early and personal life
Astrup was born in Oslo in March 1939. His parents were ship owners Nils Ebbessøn Astrup and Hedevig Stang.

He was a bachelor, with no children.

Career
Having passed examen artium in 1958, Astrup graduated as cand.jur. in 1966. He then worked for various company outside Norway, mostly in New York City, in order to achieve qualifications in the fields of finance and shipping. When his father died in 1972, Astrup took over leadership of the ship broker company Fearnley & Egers Befragtningsforretning AS.

Astrup was heir to a "substantial shipping and real-estate empire", which he has grown.

In 2011, his net worth was estimated at NOK 5 billion.

In 2013, he was described as a "billionaire" and had established a second foundation.

Art collector

In 1993, he founded the Astrup Fearnley Museum of Modern Art in Oslo, Norway.

Astrup appeared in the ARTnews list of the top 200 collectors every year since 1992. He had a collection of about 1,500 works of avant-garde Norwegian and international art.

References

1939 births
2021 deaths
Norwegian billionaires
Norwegian art collectors
Businesspeople from Oslo in shipping
Museum founders
Collectors from Oslo